The Pantages Theatre or Jones Building in Tacoma, Washington was designed by the architect B. Marcus Priteca.  The unusual structure opened in January 1918.  It was designed to be an office building and a vaudeville theatre. The theaters Second Renaissance Revival style is juxtaposed with the Commercial style. The exterior above the ground floor is largely unaltered. The building still houses entertainment and commercial activities (Tacoma City Theaters).

Exterior
It stands at the end of a block formed by Commerce Street, Ninth Street, and Broadway Plaza. The setting is characterized of downtown commercial activities and remains faithful to late 19th and early 20th century streetscapes. The theatre-office building measures  on the north (Ninth Street) by   along the west (Broadway). The building uses a steel framed with reinforced concrete walls. The Ninth Street and Broadway facades are white, glazed terra cotta in a matt finish. The Commerce Street façade is yellowish-toned brick.
The Ninth Street facade of the Theater is divided horizontally into three major sections, and vertically into five bays. The lower level of the facade, which conforms to the steep Ninth Street grade, has received a minimum of elaboration - typical of a Renaissance, palazzo base. The central level of this elevation, equivalent to three stories in height, features a triple-arched blind arcade set within the three central bays. Each individual archway: is punctuated by a pedimented, structural opening with a large ornamental cartouche above. These central bays are each framed by imposing, pseudo-Corinthian pilasters and half pilasters, full three stories, in height. The blind arcade is solidly flanked by sparsely-decorated outermost bays. Structural openings on the same level as those of the central bays are capped with segmental-arched pediments. Five bracketed balconettes underline these openings, creating a strong horizontal course, which firmly ties the variant bays together. A heavily proportioned entablature repeats the-horizontal movement across the full five bays on this facade. The entablature has a simple architrave, festooned frieze, and cornice with a boldly projecting dentil course. A substantial parapet above the cornice is simply ornamented with raised terra cotta rosettes, and rectangles. .

Interior
The auditorium is elliptical the proscenium arch and stage located on the south wall. The small orchestra pit can be entered through the greenroom below the stage. Dressing rooms flank the greenroom at that level. Because of the very steep grade on Ninth Street, large spaces below the auditorium level were available for rehearsals and storage. At the lowest level on Commerce Street, the heating and electrical systems were installed.
Decorative features of the auditorium rely upon the lavish use of. The proscenium arch is covered with classical motifs executed in plaster by European craftsmen.  At the center is an elaborate floral cartouche. Projecting from the cartouche is a torch. Fluted, engaged columns flank the proscenium. The auditorium's entablature has a dentil led cornice with shell finials. Above the entablature is the coved ceiling with gutter lighting. At the center of the ceiling is an art glass sunburst, instead of a traditional crystal chandelier. Boxes are located on either side in the ante-proscenium area. Each is an arch-shaped niche ornamented on its interior by rosettes and a large shell motif. The box entrance is enframed by a complex arrangement of pilasters, entablature, and broken pediment.

See also
Broadway Center for the Performing Arts

Bibliography
Richard F. McCann, A.I.A. - Adaptation of Tacoma Pantages Theatre - to serve the Existing Need for a City Center Performance Facility. M.H. Co. P.S. - Seattle and Hollywood, March, 1976, unpublished. (File Copy - City Clerk's Office)
Bonney, W.P. A History of Pierce County. 3 vols. Chicago. Pioneer Historical Publishing Company. 1927
Harvey, Paul W. Tacoma Headlines. Tacoma, Washington; The News Tribune, 1962
 (Volume 2)

McCann, Richard F., A.I.A.: a series of conversations, personal interviews during January and February and March 1976
Priteca, B. Marcus A.R.C.A., F.A.I.A.; Specifications for the Pantages/Jones Building, Tacoma, Washington dated September 1, 1916
Seattle Post-Intelligencer, October 3, 1975, page A 7

References

Theatres on the National Register of Historic Places in Washington (state)
Buildings and structures completed in 1916
Pierce County, Washington
Buildings and structures in Tacoma, Washington
Theatres in Washington (state)
Tourist attractions in Tacoma, Washington
Performing arts centers in Washington (state)
National Register of Historic Places in Tacoma, Washington